Black Blood Vomitorium is the first EP by the death metal band Necrophagia. It was released on February 28, 2000 on Red Stream Records.

Track listing

Personnel
Killjoy – vocals
Anton Crowley – guitars
Wayne Fabra – drums
Dustin Havnen – bass guitar

2000 EPs